Ronald dos Santos Lopes (born 18 June 1998), simply known as Ronald, is a Brazilian footballer who plays as a midfielder for Cuiabá, on loan from Fortaleza.

Club career
Born in Belford Roxo, Rio de Janeiro, Ronald made his senior debut with Nova Iguaçu in 2016. Ahead of the 2019 season, after featuring rarely, he joined Nacional de Muriaé of the Campeonato Mineiro Módulo II. In the remainder of the year, he also played for Ponte Preta's reserve team in the Copa Paulista.

In December 2019, Ronald moved to Juventus Jaraguá, and immediately became a regular starter. On 10 August 2020, he joined Série A side Fortaleza on loan until the end of the season.

Ronald made his debut in the top tier of Brazilian football on 20 August 2020, coming on as a second-half substitute for Felipe in a 3–1 away win against Goiás. The following 8 April, he signed a permanent contract with Fortaleza until 2024.

Career statistics

Honours
Nova Iguaçu
Campeonato Carioca Série B: 2016

Fortaleza
Campeonato Cearense: 2020, 2021, 2022
Copa do Nordeste: 2022

References

External links

1997 births
Living people
Sportspeople from Rio de Janeiro (state)
Brazilian footballers
Association football midfielders
Campeonato Brasileiro Série A players
Nova Iguaçu Futebol Clube players
Associação Atlética Ponte Preta players
Grêmio Esportivo Juventus players
Fortaleza Esporte Clube players
Cuiabá Esporte Clube players
People from Bedford Roxo